Azadirachta excelsa, commonly known as sentang, is a tree in the mahogany family Meliaceae. The specific epithet  is from the Latin meaning "lofty".

Description
Its bark is pinkish grey or pinkish brown. The sweetly scented flowers are creamy-white.

Distribution and habitat
Azadirachta excelsa is native to Malesia and Vietnam. Its habitat is rain forests from sea level to  altitude.

References

excelsa
Trees of Malesia
Trees of Vietnam
Plants described in 1820